Damirón is a Spanish surname. Notable people with this surname include:

Antonio Damirón (1794–1875), Venezuelan publisher
Casandra Damirón (1919–1983), Dominican singer, dancer and folklorist
Jean Philibert Damiron (1794–1862), French philosopher
 (1908–1992), Dominican pianist and composer

Spanish-language surnames